Colin Bock (born 29 September 1934) is a former  Australian rules footballer who played with St Kilda in the Victorian Football League (VFL).

Notes

External links 

Living people
1934 births
Australian rules footballers from Victoria (Australia)
St Kilda Football Club players